Goin' Bulilit is a Philippine sketch comedy program broadcast by ABS-CBN. The show premiered on February 6, 2005, replacing Ang Tanging Ina and aired every Sunday nights on the network's Yes Weekend! block. It also aired worldwide via TFC. The gag show featured children in various comedic situations, aiming to provide laughter for the audiences by showcasing gags, sketches, and segments. The cast is composed of child stars, except for Dagul, who portrayed different roles ranging from young to old characters every week to bring entertainment. The show ended on August 4, 2019, and was replaced by Rated K (later Rated Korina) in its time slot.

History
Goin' Bulilit premiered on February 5, 2005. The show was a spin-off of the 1980s comedy sitcom Goin' Bananas starring Christopher de Leon, Edgar Mortiz, Jay Ilagan and Johnny Delgado.

The weekly show provided different segments such as "Palarong Pambata" (children's games), "Use in a Sentence" and "Ano Daw" (one liner jokes), as well as parodies of some top-rating shows including Rated KKK (Rated K), The Buzz, and Lovers in Pares (Lovers in Paris).

In 2015, Goin' Bulilit marked and celebrated their 10th anniversary with the entire former and current cast members.

On June 9, 2019, the show was pre-empted to give away to the airing of the ABS-CBN's Binibining Pilipinas 2019: The Grand Coronation Night at 10pm.

After 14 years of broadcast, the show aired its final episode on August 4, 2019, 9 months before the shutdown of ABS-CBN caused by a cease-and-desist order from the National Telecommunications Commission after the expiration of its legislative franchise on May 2020.

In 2021, the show was re-aired and moved to Kapamilya Channel, Jeepney TV and A2Z.

Production and crew
The show was created by Edgar Mortiz, who co-directed with his son, Frasco Mortiz. Roderick Victoria served as the Creative Manager. The creative/writing team was led by headwriter Sherwin Buenvenida, and included writers Rolf Mahilom, Josel Garlitos, Toffie Runas, Yani Yuzon and Badjie Mortiz.

Cast

Segments
Final segments
"Ang Meaning Mo" - hosted by Carlo Mendoza and Jordan Lim
"Ano Daw?"
"Choose Mo!" - hosted by Chunsa Angela Jung
"Endo"
"Experi-Men" - a science experiment segment presented by the three male cast members.
"Failon Ganern" - a spoof of Failon Ngayon.
"GB Digital Shorts"
"GB Patrol" - a spoof of the flagship newscast TV Patrol.
"Hitback" - a segment that features past music videos performed by the former cast.
"Kinadenang Pinto" - a spoof of the afternoon drama series Kadenang Ginto. Played by Justin James Quilantang as Lassie (parody of Cassie), Raikko Matteo as Varga (parody of Marga), Cessa Moncera as Janiela (parody of Daniela) and Ashley Sarmiento as Robina (parody of Romina)
"Ready, Set, Goin!" (formerly Ready, Get Set, Goin!) - two teams of the cast members are assembled to play a game. Originally, it was hosted by Miles Ocampo. And later, she was replaced mostly by Dagul with various alternates (including Nash Aguas, Sharlene San Pedro, Angelo Garcia, Belle Mariano, Bugoy Cariño, Clarence Delgado, Cessa Moncera and CX Navarro) taking over in his absence.
"This Is Eat"

Former/recurring segments
"Amazing Bert" - a spoof of the network's Matanglawin and GMA's Amazing Earth. 
"Ang Parokyano" - a spoof of the action drama series FPJ's Ang Probinsyano.
Asianovela Parodies
"Lovers in Pares" - a spoof of the 2004 Korean drama Lovers in Paris.
"Princess Lululu" - a spoof of the 2005 Korean drama Princess Lulu.
"Hana Kiyeme" - a spoof of the 2006 Taiwanese drama Hanazakarino Kimitachihe (known as Hana Kimi).
"Three Wives" - a spoof of the 2009 Korean drama Two Wives.
"Ay, Chuchay!" - played by Chunsa Angela Jung as the titular character
"Auntie Patty"
"Barrio Siesta"
"Barubal: Bago at Rumaragasang Balita"
"Bow" - a skit that is brought from the defunct show TVJ: Television's Jesters of IBC.
"✓✓✓: Tseklusibong Tsekplusibong Tsekposé" a spoof of Current Affairs Program, XXX: Exklusibong, Explosibong, Exposé
"Cute and A"
"Da Bus" - is a parody of the styles of talk show.
"Dag's Amusing Short Stories" - a spoof of GMA Network's defunct informative show Kap's Amazing Stories. Hosted by Dagul.
"Dyesebella of Desire" - a spoof crossover of three drama series from 2014: Dyesebel, Mirabella, and Moon of Desire.
"Ektertainment Live!" - a spoof of a defunct showbiz-oriented talk show Entertainment Live.
"EmoJim"
"Esmyuskee!" - a skit that is brought from the defunct show Ang TV.
"Fashion de Amor" - a spoof of the 2003 Colombian telenovela Pasión de Gavilanes (also known in the Philippines as Pasión de Amor).
"Fliptop"
"Ginto't Pilak"
"GB Comics"
"Happy and Wacky"
"Hay Tatay!"
"How How I Know Haw with Islaw"
"Huli Kaw" - a segment where they prank people like by scaring them with a fake horror nun.
"I Love Betty La Pieta" - a spoof crossover of two drama series from 2008: I Love Betty La Fea, and Pieta.
"I'm Corny" - a segment based on the song "Horny '98" by Mousse T., Hot 'n' Juicy and Inaya Day.
"Isang Talong, Isang Sagot" - hosted by Chunsa Angela Jung
"Ismol T3" - a spoof of TV5's public service program T3.
"Ipaglaban Mwah!" - a spoof of the legal drama anthology series Ipaglaban Mo! hosted by Atty. Jose Sison and Jopet Sison (portrayed by Miguelito de Guzman and Izzy Canillo respectively.)
"Juan and Ted"
"Kulilats" - a spoof of the defunct children's show Kulilits.
"Kwelaserye Parodies"
"Magic Mike"
"MYX MYX MYX: Myxklusibong Myxplosibong Musyx" - is a combined parody of music channel Myx and the current affairs program XXX: Exklusibong, Explosibong, Exposé.
"TrabaHoldap" - a spoof of  It's Showtime’s segment TrabaHula.
News and Current Affairs Parodies
"Kursunada" - a spoof of reality drama program Krusada.
"Mantika" - a spoof of the late night newscast Bandila.
"Mutyatya ng Masa" - a spoof of Mutya ng Masa.
"Rated KKK" - a spoof of the magazine show Rated K' (' using the name of Katipunan. Played by Sharlene San Pedro as Korina K. Kanchez (parody of Korina Sanchez)
"Red Haller" - a spoof of Red Alert.
"Salamat Joke" - a spoof of the medical show Salamat Dok.
"Umagang Kay Bongga" - a spoof of the morning program Umagang Kay Ganda.
"Nagbabalibagang Balita" - a spoof of Nagbabagang Balita/ABS-CBN News Patrol.
"Dos Por Dos Por Santo" - a spoof of DZMM’s news and commentary program Dos Por Dos.
"Isumbong Mo Kay Jeff Tolpu" - a spoof of public service program Isumbong Mo Kay Tulfo.Tiagong Ang-Kyut - a spoof of teaser of TV adaptation of Tiagong Akyat.
"Nora the Explorer" - a spoof of Nickelodeon's educational cartoon series Dora the Explorer, played by Chacha Cañete as the titular character. 
"Not Not Palusot" - played by Justin James (JJ) Quilantang as the titular character who is a stubborn and sarcastic child.
"Oh May Guest"
"Payabangan"
"Pauso Mo, Jessica So Cute/i-Post Mo, Miss So Cute" - a spoof of GMA Network's magazine show Kapuso Mo, Jessica Soho. Played by Chunsa Angela Jung as the titular character.
"Perla Patola"
"Ping vs. Pong"
"Q&A"
"Reneboy"
"Sinetch Itey"
Talk Show Parodies
"Gandang Gabi, ‘Bai!" - a spoof of the comedy talk show Gandang Gabi, Vice!.
"La Buzz" - a spoof of the showbiz-oriented talk show The Buzz.
"Matandang Buhay" - a spoof of the morning talk show Magandang Buhay with the cast played as old people (John Steven de Guzman as Lolay (parody of Melai Cantiveros), Izzy Canillo as Jolalina (parody of Jolina Magdangal) and Clarence Delgado as Karlalola (parody of Karla Estrada)).
 "Tanong Ko Lang"
Teleserye Parodies
"Ginulunang Palad" - a spoof of Gulong ng Palad.
"Maria Flordeluha" - a spoof of Maria Flordeluna.
"Ysabellat" - a spoof of Ysabella.
"May Butas Pa" - a spoof of May Bukas Pa.
"Nagsimula sa Nguso" - a spoof of Nagsimula sa Puso. Played by Mika dela Cruz as the titular character.
"Powder at Langis" - a spoof of Tubig at Langis trailer.
"Praningning" - a spoof of Ningning. Played by Mutya Orquia as the titular character.
"Till I Met Chu" - a spoof of Till I Met You trailer. As a result, this skit was promoted the augmented reality mobile game  Pokémon Go.
"Nang Ngumiti ang Pangit" - a spoof of Nang Ngumiti ang Langit.
Annual segments
"12 Days of Christmas" - a spoof of the popular Christmas song performed by the cast, featuring current events from the previous year. When the show starts to broadcast in high definition in 2016, the skit was revamped with an interactive version. After the show was ended in 2019, the skit was migrated to Sunday 'Kada of Brightlight Productions for TV5.
"Mga Bagong Programa" - a segment features the temporary changing of the titles of the ABS-CBN shows for Holy Week.
"What's In, What's Out" - a segment featuring the changes or comparisons of various persons, places, foods, objects and pop cultures from the previous year to the next year. This is originated from Goin' Bananas.
"Ngayong [Year]" - a segment featuring cast members telling about what could possibly happen in that particular year, followed by the grim reaper singing "Ngayong (number of the year)" (i.e. "Ngayooong 2019!"), with the tone of the ABS-CBN Jingle. And after, the main anchor will ask if those predictions will become true or not commanding to text their answers on a given number of the year, and followed by the grim reaper (usually holding a cellphone at the end) singing "Text to (number of the year as a dial number)" (i.e. "Text to 2-0-1-9")
"Balitang [Seasonal]" - a news segment on anything else for every season (i.e. "Balitang Monito Monita").

Special episodesGoin' Bulilit has aired their special full story episodes which starred by the kids instead of the actual regular episodes:Palibhasa Lalake (September 7, 2008; ABS-CBN's 55th anniversary special)Taguan Pung (February 21, 2010; 5th anniversary horror special)Prom the Bottom of My Heart (February 28, 2010; 5th anniversary musical special)Langit Lupa (October 31, 2010; Halloween special)Sa Araw ng Pasko (November 28, 2010; Christmas drama special based on the song "Sa Araw Ng Pasko")Huwag Mo Akong Galitin (December 5, 2010; Fernando Poe Jr. tribute special)Juan Kontra (December 26, 2010; Christmas fantasy special)Dance Upon A Time (January 9, 2011; post-New Year special)Inkredibulok (January 16, 2011; a spoof of Incredible Hulk)In My Dreams (March 6, 2011, post-Valentine special based on the song "In My Dreams")18 Goin' 8 (September 8, 2013; ABS-CBN's 60th anniversary special)Kalaro (October 27, 2013; Halloween special)House for Sale (February 23, 2014; 9th anniversary special)The Prodigal Son (April 13 and 20, 2014; Lenten drama special)Noong Unang Panahon, Panahon ng Hapon (June 8, 2014; Independence Day special)Do Not Enter (October 25, 2015; Halloween special)Yaya Maring (April 1, 2018; Easter special)Pamilya Cruz (May 14, 2018; Summer drama special)14th Floor (February 24, 2019; 14th anniversary special)Abangan ang Susunod na Kongressman (March 24 and 31, 2019; pre-reformat special, title based on Abangan Ang Susunod Na Kabanata)Sister Mia (April 28, 2019)

Merchandise
DVDThe Best of Goin' Bulilit was released on December 27, 2007 featuring the best of the first 100 episodes of Goin' Bulilit. The DVD includes the show's best segments, spoofs, gags, and sketches such as "Rekolilit", "Noon at Ngayon", "Hinulugang Taktak", "Mahal Mo Ba Ako?", "Lovers in Pares", "Rated KKK", "Ginulungang Palad", and "GB Patrol". It also includes a bonus feature for bloopers. Special features include the "Best Funny Faces" compilation and interviews of the kids.

The show also features videos of kids who auditioned for the show. Makisig Morales was included in the people who auditioned for Batch 3, but did not make it.

Cast
The cast basically includes the first batch of Goin' Bulilit.

DVD cover
The following are the cast who are featured on the DVD cover, but not in the video. They are the new kids:

Presenters
The following individuals and groups, listed in order of appearance, presented or introduced the segments:
Igiboy Flores - Opening remarks; introduced "Use It", "Old Joke", and "Noon at Ngayon" segments
John Manalo - presented "Hinulugang Taktak" sketch, a silent comic sketch based on Charlie Chaplin
Sharlene San Pedro - presented her own segment, "Korina K. Kanchez's Rated KKK" (based on Korina Sanchez's Rated K), "GB Patrol" (based on TV Patrol).
Nikki Bagaporo - presented "Lovers in Pares" (based on Lovers in Paris), "Ginulungang Palad" (based on "Gulong ng Palad")
Sharlene San Pedro and Igiboy Flores - introduced a collection of Bulilit's face reactions after throwing a joke, compilation of "Bloopers"

Accolades

See also
List of programs aired by ABS-CBNBanana SundaeGoin' Bananas''

References

External links

2005 Philippine television series debuts
2019 Philippine television series endings
ABS-CBN original programming
Filipino-language television shows
Philippine comedy television series
Philippine television sketch shows
Television series about children
Television spin-offs